Ganpat Gaikwad is an Indian politician and member of Bharatiya Janata Party. Gaikwad is a three term member of the Maharashtra Legislative Assembly representing the Kalyan east constituency.

References 

Bharatiya Janata Party politicians from Maharashtra
Maharashtra MLAs 2014–2019
Living people
Year of birth missing (living people)
Marathi politicians